Breast eczema  may affect the nipples, areolae, or surrounding skin, with eczema of the nipples being of the moist type with oozing and crusting, in which painful fissuring is frequently seen, especially in nursing mothers. It will often occur in pregnancy even without breast feeding.

Persisting eczema of the nipple in the middle-aged and elderly needs to be discussed with a doctor, as a rare type of breast cancer called Paget's disease can cause these symptoms.

See also
Skin lesion

References

External links 

Eczema